
Gmina Sulmierzyce is a rural gmina (administrative district) in Pajęczno County, Łódź Voivodeship, in central Poland.

Villages
Gmina Sulmierzyce contains the villages and settlements of Anielów, Bieliki, Bogumiłowice, Chorzenice, Dąbrowa, Dąbrówka, Dworszowice Pakoszowe, Eligiów, Filipowizna, Kąty, Kodrań, Ksawerów, Kuźnica, Łęczyska, Marcinów, Markowizna, Nowa Wieś, Ostrołęka, Patyków, Piekary, Stanisławów, Sulmierzyce, Sulmierzyce-Kolonia, Trzciniec, Wiśniów, Wola Wydrzyna and Złotniki.

Neighbouring gminas
Gmina Sulmierzyce is bordered by the gminas of Kleszczów, Lgota Wielka, Pajęczno, Rząśnia, Strzelce Wielkie and Szczerców.

References
Polish official population figures 2006

Sulmierzyce
Pajęczno County